Lea and Darija is a 2012 Croatian biographical film directed by Branko Ivanda. The film is based on the life of Lea Deutsch, a Jewish girl who was a dancing and acting star in Zagreb on the eve of World War II.

Cast 
 Klara Naka as Lea Deutsch
 Tamy Zajec as Darija Gasteiger
 Zrinka Cvitešić as Ivka Deutsch
  as Melita Gasteiger
 Sebastian Cavazza as Stjepan Deutsch
  as Tadija Kukic
 Dražen Čuček as Tito Strozzi
 Zijad Gračić as Dušan Žanko
 Goran Grgić as Dubravko Dujšin
 Radovan Ruždjak as Rod Riffler

References

External links 

2012 biographical drama films
2012 films
Holocaust films
World War II films based on actual events
Croatian biographical drama films
2012 drama films
Films set in Zagreb
Cultural depictions of Yugoslav people
Cultural depictions of Croatian people
2010s Croatian-language films